Barsaat Ki Raat is a 1960 Indian Hindi-language romantic musical film directed by P. L. Santoshi and produced by R. Chandra. Starring Madhubala, Bharat Bhushan and Shyama, the film is considered a defining example of romantic musical film genre.

A Muslim-social set amongst the erudite and cultured urban Muslims of independent India, Barsaat Ki Raat revolves around two lovers Shabnam (Madhubala) and Amaan Hyderabadi (Bhushan), who strive to be together but the society does not approve of them. Upon its release, the film became a blockbuster success, the second highest earner of 1960, the twenty highest earner of the 1960s at the Indian box office, and one of the top hundred highest-grossers of all time (when adjusted for inflation).

Barsaat Ki Raat got a positive feedback from contemporary critics. The Roshan-composed soundtrack, considered one of the finest in the Indian cinema, was singled out for praise by both critics and audience. One of the tracks, "Zindagi Bhar Nahi Bhoolegi" topped the music charts that year. A cult film now, Barsaat Ki Raat has been lauded by 21st century critics, who have particularly noted Madhubala's performance and the soundtrack. The latter continues to be widely popular and imitated.

Plot 
Amaan is a talented and struggling Urdu poet trying to making a mark in the world of music. Shabnam, who has not seen him yet, loves his songs and poetry. When they meet accidentally in a stormy rainy night, Amaan and Shabnam fall in love with each other. Luck comes his way as he is appointed as a tutor for Shabnam's little sister Razia.

Amaan and Shabnam start romancing each other and plan to marry soon. However, Shabnam's father Khan Bahadur is not much impressed of Amaan due to Amaan's poverty. He insults and expels Amaan from their house and fixes a devastated Shabnam's marriage with Aftab Ahmed of Lucknow against her wish. Khan Bahadur sets off for Lucknow with his family. Amaan also arrives at Lucknow in search of his fortune. Coincidentally, Amaan discovers that Aftab, the friend in whose house he is staying is actually the future husband of his lady love Shabnam.

Amaan leaves Aftab's house without noticing him. Meanwhile, Amaan's old friends Shabab and Shama arrive at Lucknow to participate in a qawwali competition, in which they keep losing. Shama is in love with Amaan, but he does not know this. Amaan begins to compose shayaris for the competition and very quickly he carves a niche for himself in the musical world. However, submerged in the painful memory of his lost love Shabnam, Amaan does not realise Shama's unconditional love for him. Anyway, he becomes the heart and soul of Shama's musical troupe. With Amaan's beautiful voice and shayaris, Shama's group attains popularity and win in the competition. 

A shattered and imprisoned Shabnam overhears Amaan's voice on radio and learns that Aman is still in Lucknow. Shabnam somehow reaches one of Aman's poetic duels. Shama faints during the program when she learns that Amaan is in love with someone else. Her sickness gives a platform Shabnam and Amaan to meet each other. Khan Bhadur and Shekhar reach the spot searching for the missing Shabnam. At this point Shabnam's mother revolts against Khan Bahadur, for she wants her daughter to be happy. At the end, Khan Bhadur gives in and the lovers reunite on another rainy night.

Cast 

Madhubala as Shabnam
Bharat Bhushan as Amaan Hyderabadi / Mirza Lakhnauwi
Shyama as Shama
Ratna Bhushan as Shabab, Shama's sister
K. N. Singh as Inspector Khan Bahadur (Shanam's father)
Mumtaz Begum as Begum Khan Bahadur (Shabnam's mother)
Chandrashekhar as Inspector Shekhar (Aman's friend)
Baby Shobha as Razia (Shabnam's sister)
Peace Kanwal as Barrister Aftab Ahmed

Crew 
Dialogue: Sarshar Sailani
Background music: Sonik
Art Director: Ganesh Basak

Themes 
The story features a number of innovative themes while maintaining the basic form of a love story. It has particularly strong female characters who are independent-minded and choose their own loves and destiny. Conflicts are not so much between the wishes of the parents and children about whom the children will marry, as is a common theme in Indian movies, but on the more complex level of conflicts among the main characters and the duplicitous signals men and women send each other. The movie glorifies the lives of "singing girls" not often regarded highly in Indian society.  Although it is set with Muslim characters, the movie seamlessly shows the universality of sensual love.

Soundtrack 
The soundtrack of Barsaat Ki Raat was composed by Roshan, and lyrics were penned by Sahir Ludhianavi. It was the second best-selling soundtrack of 1960 after Mughal-e-Azam. The song "Zindagi Bhar Nahin Bhoolegi" was a chartbuster, and was on the top in the  Binaca Geetmala's annual list of 1960.

Rediff.com, calling the film's music its lifeline, placed "Na To Karavan Ki Talash Hai" at the second place in the "Bollywood's Top 10 qawwalis."

Reception

Box office 
Barsaat Ki Raat was released on 9 December 1960, to a positive response from critics and audience. In India, the film had a box office gross of ₹3.5  crore, with a nett of ₹1.75 crore, becoming the second highest-grossing film of 1960. The Best of the Year gave its inflation-adjusted nett as ₹516.8 crore. Box Office magazine calculated its inflation-adjusted gross by comparing the collection with the price of gold in 1960, which gave it an adjusted gross of ₹785.88 crore in 2011.

The film was listed at number 22 by Box Office magazine in their list of "Top 50 Film of Last 50 Years" which feature all-time highest-grossing Bollywood films by using the relative price of gold in different years to arrive at a hypothetical current value of box-office collections of past films.

Critical reception 
Contemporary reviews were generally positive. On 30 December, The Indian Express noted Santoshi's direction and performances, particularly of Madhubala and Shyama. Most of the praise was directed towards the film's "outstanding feature", the qawwalis.

Recent reviewers have acclaimed the film for its music and performances. Film critic Venkat Parsa of The Siasat Daily applauded the innovative themes Barsaat Ki Raat uses and stated that the film "stands apart [and] breaks away from the past trends". Parsa also noted the lyrics of "Zindagi Bhar Nahi Bhoolegi", which begins with Amaan narrating his encounter with Shabnam and then singing the "graphic detail", that proves that lyricist Sahir Ludhianvi was "a progressive and revolutionary poet". In the conclusion, Parsa described the film as the "greatest-ever musical of all times of the Indian cinema". Writer Monica Kar, in a typical mixed review, found the story to be "a little predictable and not very exciting by modern standards" but its treatment to be "delightful". She appreciated the scene in which Amaan and Shabnam meet: "[It] portrays confusion, a little fear, a little mystery, a little attraction. Madhubala is brilliant in this one scene." Madhubala's dramatic performance has been especially noted by critics and is cited to be one of the finest of her career.

Legacy 
Barsaat Ki Raat is considered a milestone in the history of Indian cinema and is known for popularizing the romantic musical genre in films.

In popular culture 
Buffy Sainte-Marie, a Canadian singer covered the song "Maayus To Hoon Vade Se Tere" from the movie, which she called the track "Mayoo Sto Hoon". The song was released on her debut album, It's My Way!, in 1964.

See also 
List of Bollywood films of 1960
100 crore club

References

External links 
 

1960 films
1960s Indian films
1960s Hindi-language films
Films scored by Roshan
Urdu-language Indian films